San Damián Airport is an airstrip  west of Vichuquén commune in the Maule Region of Chile.

The runway is only  in from the Pacific coast, on a moderately wide shelf above several coastal settlements. The runway elevation rises from south to north, with hilly terrain immediately east of the airstrip.

See also

Transport in Chile
List of airports in Chile

References

External links
OpenStreetMap - San Damián Airport
OurAirports - San Damián Airport
FallingRain - San Damián

Airports in Chile
Airports in Maule Region